The Beijing Municipal Commission of Education or Beijing Municipal Education Commission (BMEC) is the local education authority of the Beijing municipal government. This education authority is currently headquartered at 109 Qianmen West Street, Xicheng District and it was previously headquartered in the Beijing Olympic Building (S: 北京奥运大厦, T: 北京奧運大廈, P: Běijīng Àoyùn Dàshà) in Haidian District.

See also
 Education in Beijing
 Lists of schools in Beijing

References

External links
 Beijing Municipal Commission of Education
 Beijing Municipal Commission of Education 
 Beijing Municipal Commission of Education - City of Beijing. February 19, 2008. Alternate copy at China Daily

Education in Beijing
Politics of Beijing